Konstantin Scherbakov (11 June 1963 in Barnaul, Siberia, Russian SFSR) is a Russian pianist. He was the winner of the first Rachmaninoff international piano competition in 1983. In 1990, he played solo in four recitals at the Chamber Music Festival of Asolo; this launched his international career.

Scherbakov has had a successful recording career for Naxos Records; among his CDs on that label are recordings of all Tchaikovsky's Piano Concertos, the nine Beethoven symphonies (as transcribed for the piano by Liszt), and music by Godowsky, Medtner, Respighi, Shostakovich, and Lyapunov. Critical acclaim has been high; Gramophone magazine has said that Scherbakov plays with "delicacy and affection", and the German Critics' Circle has twice awarded Scherbakov its top prize, once for a recording of Godowsky's Sonata in E minor and again a rare performance of Franz Liszt's incredibly difficult transcription of Beethoven's Ninth Symphony. His record of Shostakovich's Twenty-Four Preludes and Fugues was labeled "a triumph" by ClassicsToday.com, and won him a classical award at Cannes in 2001.

Since 1998, Konstantin Scherbakov has been professor at the Zurich University of the Arts. He is a jury member in major international competitions (such as ARD Munich, Busoni in Bolzano, Liszt in Weimar, and among others Rio de Janeiro, Seoul, Havana etc.) and he regularly holds master classes all over the world (Germany, Italy, Switzerland, New Zealand, Singapore, Cuba, Russia, South Africa, Japan, Brazil). Many of his students won prizes and awards at international competitions, most recently Yulianna Avdeeva, the winner of the 2010 International Chopin Competition in Warsaw.

Scherbakov has lived with his family in Zurich, Switzerland since 1992. He spends much of his time in Spain and Russia.

References 
Konstantin Scherbakov biography and discography at Naxos.com

1963 births
Living people
People from Barnaul
Russian classical pianists
Academic staff of the Zurich University of the Arts
21st-century classical pianists